Deh-e Sefid (also Romanized as Deh-e Sefīd) is a village in Ali Jamal Rural District, in the Central District of Boshruyeh County, South Khorasan Province, Iran. At the 2006 census, its population was 30, in 12 families.

References 

Populated places in Boshruyeh County